China has great physical diversity. The eastern plains and southern coasts of the country consist of fertile lowlands and foothills. They are the location of most of China's agricultural output and human population. The southern areas of the country (South of the Yangtze River) consist of hilly and mountainous terrain. The west and north of the country are dominated by sunken basins (such as the Gobi and the Taklamakan), rolling plateaus, and towering massifs. It contains part of the highest tableland on earth, the Tibetan Plateau, and has much lower agricultural potential and population.

Traditionally, the Chinese population centered on the Chinese central plain and oriented itself toward its own enormous inland market, developing as an imperial power whose center lay in the middle and lower reaches of the Yellow River on the northern plains. More recently, the  coastline has been used extensively for export-oriented trade, causing the coastal provinces to become the leading economic center.

The exact land area is sometimes challenged by border disputes, most notably about Taiwan, Aksai Chin, the Trans-Karakoram Tract, and South Tibet. The area of the People's Republic of China is  according to the CIA's The World Factbook. The People's Republic of China is either the third or fourth largest country in the world, being either slightly larger or slightly smaller than the United States depending on how the area of the United States is measured. Both countries are smaller than Russia and Canada and larger than Brazil.

Overview 

China has great physical diversity. The eastern plains and southern coasts of the country consist of fertile lowlands and foothills. They are the location of most of China's agricultural output and human population. The southern areas of the country (South of the Yangtze River) consist of hilly and mountainous terrain. The west and north of the country are dominated by sunken basins (such as the Gobi and the Taklamakan), rolling plateaus, and towering massifs. It contains part of the highest tableland on earth, the Tibetan Plateau, and has much lower agricultural potential and population.

Demography 
Traditionally, the Chinese population centered on the Chinese central plain and oriented itself toward its own enormous inland market, developing as an imperial power whose center lay in the middle and lower reaches of the Yellow River on the northern plains. More recently, the  coastline has been used extensively for export-oriented trade, causing the coastal provinces to become the leading economic center.

The exact land area is sometimes challenged by border disputes, most notably about Taiwan, Aksai Chin, the Trans-Karakoram Tract, and South Tibet. The area of the People's Republic of China is  according to the CIA's The World Factbook. The People's Republic of China is either the third or fourth largest country in the world, being either slightly larger or slightly smaller than the United States depending on how the area of the United States is measured. Both countries are smaller than Russia and Canada and larger than Brazil.

Physical Geography

Generalities 

The topography of China has been divided by the Chinese government into five homogeneous physical macro-regions, namely Eastern China (subdivided into the northeast plain, north plain, and southern hills), Xinjiang-Mongolia, and the Tibetan highlands. It is diverse with snow-capped mountains, deep river valleys, broad basins, high plateaus, rolling plains, terraced hills, sandy dunes with many other geographic features and other landforms present in myriad variations. In general, the land is high in the west and descends to the east coast. Mountains (33 percent), plateaus (26 percent) and hills (10 percent) account for nearly 70 percent of the country's land surface.  Most of the country's arable land and population are based in lowland plains (12 percent) and basins (19 percent), though some of the greatest basins are filled with deserts. The country's rugged terrain presents problems for the construction of overland transportation infrastructure and requires extensive terracing to sustain agriculture, but is conducive to the development of forestry, mineral and hydropower resources, and tourism.

Eastern China 

Northeast Plain
Northeast of Shanhaiguan a narrow sliver of flat coastal land opens up into the vast Northeast China Plain. The plains extend north to the crown of the "Chinese rooster," near where the Greater and Lesser Hinggan ranges converge.  The Changbai Mountains to the east divide China from the Korean peninsula. Compared with the rest of the area of China, here live the most Chinese people due to its adequate climate and topography.

North plain
The Taihang Mountains form the western side of the triangular North China Plain. The other two sides are the Pacific coast to the east and the Yangtze River to the southwest. The vertices of this triangle are Beijing to the north, Shanghai to the southeast, and Yichang to the southwest.  This alluvial plain, fed by the Yellow and Yangtze Rivers, is one of the most heavily populated regions of China.  The only mountains in the plain are the Taishan in Shandong and Dabie Mountains of Anhui.

Beijing, at the north tip of the North China Plain, is shielded by the intersection of the Taihang and Yan Mountains. Further north are the drier grasslands of the Inner Mongolian Plateau, traditionally home to pastoralists. To the south are agricultural regions, traditionally home to sedentary populations. The Great Wall of China was built in the mountains across the mountains that mark the southern edge of the Inner Mongolian Plateau.

South (hills)

East of the Tibetan Plateau, deeply folded mountains fan out toward the Sichuan Basin, which is ringed by mountains with 1,000–3,000 m elevation.  The floor of the basin has an average elevation of 500 m and is home to one of the most densely farmed and populated regions of China.  The Sichuan Basin is capped in the north by the eastward continuation of the Kunlun range, the Qinling, and the Dabashan.  The Qinling and Dabashan ranges form a major north-south divide across China Proper, the traditional core area of China.  Southeast of the Tibetan Plateau and south of the Sichuan Basin is the Yunnan-Guizhou Plateau, which occupies much of southwest China.  This plateau, with an average elevation of 2,000 m, is known for its limestone karst landscape.

South of the Yangtze, the landscape is more rugged.  Like Shanxi Province to the north, Hunan and Jiangxi each have a provincial core in a river basin that is surrounded by mountains.  The Wuling range separates Guizhou from Hunan.  The Luoxiao and Jinggang divide Hunan from Jiangxi, which is separated from Fujian by the Wuyi Mountains.  The southeast coastal provinces, Zhejiang, Fujian and Guangdong, have rugged coasts, with pockets of lowland and mountainous interior.  The Nanling, an east-west mountain range across northern Guangdong, seals off Hunan and Jiangxi from Guangdong.

Xinjiang-Mongolia

Northwest of the Tibetan Plateau, between the northern slope of Kunlun and southern slope of Tian Shan, is the vast Tarim Basin of Xinjiang, which contains the Taklamakan Desert. Average elevation in the basin is 1,000 m. To the east, the basin descends into the Hami-Turpan Depression of eastern Xinjiang, where the dried lake bed of Lake Ayding, at −154m below sea level, is the lowest surface point in China and the third-lowest in the world. With temperatures that have reached 49.6 C., the lake bed ranks as one of the hottest places in China. North of Tian Shan is Xinjiang's second great basin, the Junggar, which contains the Gurbantünggüt Desert. The Junggar Basin is enclosed to the north by the Altay Mountains, which separate Xinjiang from Russia and Mongolia.

Northeast of the Tibetan Plateau, the Altun Shan-Qilian Mountains range branches off the Kunlun and creates a parallel mountain range running east-west. In between in northern Qinghai is the Qaidam Basin, with elevations of 2,600–3,000 m and numerous brackish and salt lakes. North of the Qilian is Hexi Corridor of Gansu, a natural passage between Xinjiang and China Proper that was part of the ancient Silk Road and traversed by modern highway and rail lines to Xinjiang. Further north, the Inner Mongolian Plateau, between 900–1,500 m in elevation, arcs north up the spine of China and becomes the Greater Hinggan Range of Northeast China.

Between the Qinling and the Inner Mongolian Plateau is Loess Plateau, the largest of its kind in the world, covering  in Shaanxi, parts of Gansu and Shanxi provinces, and some of Ningxia-Hui Autonomous Region. The plateau is 1,000–1,500m in elevation and is filled with loess, a yellowish, loose soil that travels easily in the wind. Eroded loess silt gives the Yellow River its color and name. The Loess Plateau is bound to the east by the Luliang Mountain of Shanxi, which has a narrow basin running north to south along the Fen River. Further east are the Taihang Mountains of Hebei, the dominant topographical feature of North China.
.

Highlands
The world's tallest mountains, the Karakorum, Pamirs and Tian Shan divide China from South and Central Asia. Eleven of the seventeen tallest mountain peaks on Earth are located on China's western borders. They include the world's tallest peak Mount Everest (8848 m) in the Himalayas on the border with Nepal and the world's second tallest peak, K2 (8611 m) on the border with Pakistan.  From these towering heights in the west, the land descends in steps like a terrace.

North of the Himalayas and east of the Karakorum/Pamirs is the vast Tibetan Plateau. It is the largest and highest plateau in the world, and for this reason is also informally known as the "Roof of the World." Its average elevation is 4000 meters above sea level. Its area is 2.5 million square kilometers which is just over a quarter of China's total area. In the north, the plateau is hemmed in by the Kunlun Mountains, which extends eastward from the intersection of the Pamirs, Karakorum and Tian Shan.

Tallest mountain peaks
Besides Mt. Everest and K2, the other 9 of the world's 17 tallest peaks on China's western borders are: Lhotse (8516 m, 4th highest), Makalu (8485 m, 5th), Cho Oyu (8188 m, 6th), Gyachung Kang (7952 m, 15th) of the Himalayas on the border with Nepal and Gasherbrum I (8080 m, 11th), Broad Peak (8051 m, 12th), Gasherbrum II (8035 m, 13th), Gasherbrum III (7946 m, 16th) and Gasherbrum IV (7932 m, 17th) of the Karakorum on the border with Pakistan. The tallest peak entirely within China is Shishapangma (8013 m, 14th) of the Tibetan Himalayas in Nyalam County of Tibet Autonomous Region.  In all, 9 of the 14 mountain peaks in the world over 8,000 m are in or on the border of China.  Another notable Himalayan peak in China is Namchabarwa (7782 m, 28th), near the great bend of the Yarlungtsanpo (upper Brahmaputra) River in eastern Tibet, and considered to be the eastern anchor of the Himalayas.

Outside the Himalayas and Karakorum, China's tallest peaks are Kongur Tagh (7649 m, 37th) and Muztagh Ata (7546 m, 43rd) in the Pamirs of western Xinjiang, Gongga Shan (7556 m, 41st) in the Great Snowy Mountains of western Sichuan; and Tömür Shan (7439 m, 60th), the highest peak of Tian Shan, on the border with Kyrgyzstan.

Rivers  

China originally had an estimated number of 50,000 rivers. However, due to statistical discrepancies, water and soil loss, and climate change, there are currently only an estimated 22,000 rivers remaining. The rivers in China have a total length of 420,000 kilometers. 1,500 have a catchment area exceeding 1,000 square kilometers. The majority of rivers flow west to east into the Pacific Ocean. The Yangtze (Chang Jiang) rises in Tibet, flows through Central China and enters the East China Sea near Shanghai. The Yangtze is 6,300 kilometers long and has a catchment area of 1.8 million square kilometers. It is the third longest river in the world, after the Amazon and the Nile. The second longest river in China is the Huang He (Yellow River). It rises in Tibet and travels circuitously for 5,464 kilometers through North China, it empties into the Bo Hai Gulf on the north coast of the Shandong Province. It has a catchment area of 752,000 square kilometers. The Heilongjiang (Heilong or Black Dragon River) flows for 3,101 kilometers in Northeast China and an additional 1,249 kilometers in Russia, where it is known as the Amur. The longest river in South China is the Zhujiang (Pearl River), which is 2,214 kilometers long. Along with its three tributaries, the Xi (West), Dong (East), and Bei (North) rivers, it forms the Pearl River Delta near Guangzhou, Zhuhai, Macau, and Hong Kong. Other major rivers are the Liaohe in the northeast, Haihe in the north, Qiantang in the east, and Lancang in the southwest.

Inland drainage involving upland basins in the north and northeast accounts for 40 percent of the country's total drainage area. Many rivers and streams flow into lakes or diminish in the desert. Some are used for irrigation.

China's territorial waters are principally marginal seas of the western Pacific Ocean. These waters lie on the indented coastline of the mainland and approximately 5,000 islands. The Yellow Sea, East China Sea, and South China Sea are marginal seas of the Pacific Ocean. More than half the coastline, predominantly in the south, is rocky; most of the remainder is sandy. The Bay of Hangzhou roughly divides the two kinds of shoreline.

 Northern plain
There is a steep drop in the river level in the North China Plain, where the river continues across the delta, it transports a heavy load of sand and mud which is deposited on the flat plain. The flow is aided by manmade embankments. As a result, the river flows on a raised ridge fifty meters above the plain. Waterlogging, floods, and course changes have recurred over the centuries. Traditionally, rulers were judged by their concern for or indifference to preservation of the embankments. In the modern era, China has undertaken extensive flood control and conservation measures.

Flowing from its source in the Qingzang highlands, the Yellow River courses toward the sea through the North China Plain, the historic center of Chinese expansion and influence. Han Chinese people have farmed the rich alluvial soils since ancient times, constructing the Grand Canal for north-south transport during the Imperial Era. The plain is a continuation of the Dongbei (Manchurian) Plain to the northeast but is separated from it by the Bohai Gulf, an extension of the Yellow Sea.

Like other densely populated areas of China, the plain is subject to floods and earthquakes.

The Hai River, like the Pearl River, flows from west to east. Its upper course consists of five rivers that converge near Tianjin, then flow seventy kilometers before emptying into the Bohai Gulf. The Huai River, rises in Henan Province and flows through several lakes before joining the Pearl River near Yangzhou.

 East and Yangtze
The Qin Mountains, a continuation of the Kunlun Mountains, divides the North China Plain from the Yangtze River Delta and is the major physiographic boundary between the two great parts of China Proper. It is a cultural boundary as it influences the distribution of customs and language. South of the Qinling mountain range divide are the densely populated and highly developed areas of the lower and middle plains of the Yangtze River and, on its upper reaches, the Sichuan Basin, an area encircled by a high barrier of mountain ranges.

The country's longest and most important waterway, the Yangtze River, is navigable for the majority of its length and has a vast hydroelectric potential. Rising on the Qingzang Plateau, the Yangtze River traverses  through the heart of the country, draining an area of  before emptying into the East China Sea. Roughly 300 million people live along its middle and lower reaches. The area is a large producer of rice and wheat. The Sichuan Basin, due to its mild, humid climate and long growing season, produces a variety of crops. It is a leading silk-producing area and an important industrial region with substantial mineral resources.

The Nanling Mountains, the southernmost of the east-west mountain ranges, overlook areas in China with a tropical climate. The climate allows two crops of rice to be grown per year. Southeast of the mountains lies a coastal, hilly region of small deltas and narrow valley plains. The drainage area of the Pearl River and its associated network of rivers occupies much of the region to the south. West of the Nanling, the Yunnan-Guizhou Plateau rises in two steps, averaging 1,200 and 1,800 m in elevation, respectively, toward the precipitous mountain regions of the eastern Qingzang Plateau.

Geology and natural resources 

China has substantial mineral reserves and is the world's largest producer of antimony, natural graphite, tungsten, and zinc. Other major minerals are aluminum, bauxite, coal, crude petroleum, diamonds, gold, iron ore, lead, magnetite, manganese, mercury, molybdenum, natural gas, phosphate rock, tin, uranium, and vanadium. China's hydropower potential is the largest in the world.

Land use

Based on 2005 estimates, 14.86% (about ) of China's total land area is arable. About 1.3% (some 116,580 km²) is planted to permanent crops and the rest planted to temporary crops. With comparatively little land planted to permanent crops, intensive agricultural techniques are used to reap harvests that are sufficient to feed the world's largest population and still have surplus for export. An estimated 544,784 km² of land were irrigated in 2004. 42.9% of total land area was used as pasture, and 17.5% was forest.

Wildlife

China lies in two of the world's major ecozones, the Palearctic and the Indomalaya. In the Palearctic zone mammals such as the horse, camel, and jerboa are found. Among the species found in the Indomalaya region are the leopard cat, bamboo rat, treeshrew, and various other species of monkeys and apes. Some overlap exists between the two regions because of natural dispersal and migration, and deer or antelope, bears, wolves, pigs, and rodents are found in all of the diverse climatic and geological environments. The famous giant panda is found only in a limited area along the Yangtze.  There is a continuing problem with trade in endangered species, although there are now laws to prohibit such activities.

Human geography

History 

Chinese history is often explained in terms of several strategic areas, defined by particular topographic limits. Starting from the Chinese central plain, the former heart of the Han populations, the Han people expanded militarily and then demographically toward the Loess Plateau, the Sichuan Basin, and the Southern Hills (as defined by the map on the left), not without resistance from local populations. Pushed by its comparatively higher demographic growth, the Han continued their expansion by military and demographic waves. The far-south of present-day China, the northern parts of today's Vietnam, and the Tarim Basin were first reached and durably subdued by the Han dynasty's armies. The Northern steppes were always the source of invasions into China, which culminated in the 13th century by Mongolian conquest of the whole China and creation of Mongolian Yuan dynasty. Manchuria, much of today's Northeast China, and Korean Peninsula were usually not under Chinese control, with the exception of some limited periods of occupation. Manchuria became strongly integrated into the Chinese empire during the late Qing dynasty, while the west side of the Changbai Mountains, formerly the home of Korean tribes, thus also entered China.

Demographic geography 

The demographic occupation follows the topography and availability of former arable lands. The Heihe–Tengchong Line, running from Heihe, Heilongjiang to Tengchong County, Yunnan divides China into two roughly equal sections–in terms of geographic area, with areas west of the line being sparsely settled and areas east densely populated, in general. Today there are 5 major religions that have been recognized by the state; Buddhism, Taoism, Protestantism, Catholicism, and Islam. Buddhism and folk religions account for roughly 21% of the population while protestants make up 5% and Islam 1.6% of the population. A substantial number of Buddhists live in the southwestern Tibetan region of the country which borders Nepal, Bangladesh, and Bhutan and most notably India, the birthplace of Buddhism. The Islamic population, consisting mostly of Hui and Uighur Muslims, is concentrated in the northwestern Xinjiang region of the country which shares borders with Mongolia, Kazakhstan, Kyrgyzstan, Tajikistan, Afghanistan, Pakistan, India, and Russia.

Administrative geography 
Chinese administrative geography was drawn mainly during the 1949 and 1954 administrative reorganizations. These reorganizations have been the source of much debate within China. In addition, a parcel of land was ceded from Guangdong to Guangxi to grant the latter immediate access to the Gulf of Tonkin, while Hainan was split from Guangdong in 1988 and Chongqing from Sichuan in 1997.

Agriculture 
As the country continues to industrialize, the share of agriculture as a part of China's GDP has lowered to 11% in recent years. Of the enormous labor force in China, 27.7% work in agriculture. China's primary agricultural import is wheat from Argentina, Australia, Canada, and France. They import about four to five million metric tons of wheat per year and they are able to buy the wheat for about $700 per ton, making wheat China's most important agricultural import. On the other hand, China's most important agricultural export is rice. China exports about 750,000 metric tons of rice per year for about $1200 per ton. Other significant agricultural exports from China are potatoes, corn, tobacco, peanuts, tea, apples, cotton, pork, mutton, eggs, fish, and shrimp.

According to the World Bank, as of 2015, China's total arable land was estimated at 119,000,000 hectares.  Since 2005, arable land in China has been on the decline and the total arable land per citizen has reached .2 acres. As a percentage, agricultural land makes up about 54.7% of land. The climate of the country is difficult to describe because it varies so much depending on the region of China. The southernmost parts of the country are almost tropical, while the northernmost part is subarctic.

Boundary disputes

Territory 
The territory of China has been defined as a homeland for many different ethnic and racial groups in the country. However, the way that the territory has been defined varies between ethnic groups. In relation to the Han Chinese, the homeland has been defined by national borders which are more or less accepted internationally. This is because the Han Chinese are the largest population and have most influence politically than any other ethnic population in China. To the Han Chinese population, the territory of the country is defined by the regions of Tibet, inner Mongolia, Manchuria, and the Xinjiang Province which is the most western land of China. The Chinese territory is the second largest in land area and also has the longest combined land border in the world. However, there are many other ethnic groups in China that have their own definitions of what concerns the territory of China.

One group of people in China are the Tibetans. Tibetans and the land of Tibet are considered by the Han Chinese government to be part of China and that the territory of Tibet is also part of the country. However, many Tibetans disagree and are protesting as well as rallying for freedom in present day. To this ethnic population, the territory of Tibet is not considered part of China and so is not defined as a Chinese territory. However, the Chinese government still consider Tibet as a territory of China which reflects the dispute in definition of Chinese territory between two ethnic groups.

Another group of people which have a dispute in definition of territory are the Taiwanese. The Taiwanese people inhabit the island of Taiwan and are markedly politically different as the people of Taiwan have a free market capitalist based economy while the mainland Chinese government employ a communistic state run economy. There are disputes in the definition of territory between Taiwan and China as the Chinese government claims ownership over Taiwan while some Taiwanese people maintain that they are a sovereign state completely independent from the mainland Chinese government. These disputes have led to international controversy as many countries such as the United States of America have not officially recognized the sovereignty of Taiwan.

Central Asia
In the western sector, China claimed portions of the  Pamir Mountains area, a region of soaring mountain peaks and glacier-filled valleys where the borders of Afghanistan, Pakistan, the former Soviet Union, and China meet in Central Asia. North and east of this region, some sections of the border remained undemarcated in 1987. The  frontier with the Soviet Union has been a source of continual friction. In 1954 China published maps showing substantial portions of Soviet Siberian territory as its own. In the northeast, border friction with the Soviet Union produced a tense situation in remote regions of Inner Mongolia and Heilongjiang along segments of the Argun River, Amur River, and Ussuri River. Each side had massed troops and had exchanged charges of border provocation in this area. In a September 1986 speech in Vladivostok, the Soviet leader Mikhail S. Gorbachev offered the Chinese a more conciliatory position on Sino-Soviet border issues. In 1987 the two sides resumed border talks that had been broken off after the 1979 Soviet invasion of Afghanistan (see Sino-Soviet relations). Although the border issue remained unresolved as of late 1987, China and the Soviet Union agreed to consider the northeastern sector first. In October 2004, China signed an agreement with Russia on the delimitation of their entire -long border, which had long been in dispute.

Southern border
Eastward from Bhutan and north of the Brahmaputra River (Yarlung Zangbo Jiang) lies a large area controlled and administered by India but claimed by the Chinese. The area was demarcated by the British McMahon Line, drawn along the Himalayas in 1914 as the Sino-Indian border; India accepts and China rejects this boundary. In June 1980 China made its first move in twenty years to settle the border disputes with India, proposing that India cede the Aksai Chin area in Jammu and Kashmir to China in return for China's recognition of the McMahon Line; India did not accept the offer, however, preferring a sector-by-sector approach to the problem. In July 1986 China and India held their seventh round of border talks, but they made little headway toward resolving the dispute. Each side, but primarily India, continued to make allegations of incursions into its territory by the other. Most of the mountainous and militarized boundary with India is still in dispute, but Beijing and New Delhi have committed to begin resolution with discussions on the least disputed middle sector. India does not recognize Pakistan's ceding lands to China in a 1964 boundary agreement.

The China-Burma border issue was settled 1 October 1960, by the signing of the Sino-Burmese Boundary Treaty. The first joint inspection of the border was completed successfully in June 1986.

India: On 15 May 2015, Mr. Li from China and Mr. Modi from India held talks at the Great Hall of the people during Modi's China tour. The two leaders held talks on border disputes that began in 1914 when the British still controlled India and signed an agreement with Tibet to make the McMahon line the de facto boundary between India and China, even though China had rejected this agreement. Both countries had various claims to disputed territories such as the South Tibetan region of Zangnan which is considered to be part of the Arunachal Pradesh state in India. So far there have been only talks and no solutions and tensions continue to rise as each country continues to increase regional influences.

Seas

China is involved in a complex dispute with Malaysia, Philippines, Vietnam, and possibly Brunei over the Spratly (Nansha) Islands in the South China Sea. The 2002 "Declaration on the Conduct of Parties in the South China Sea" eased tensions but fell short of a legally binding code of conduct desired by several of the disputants. China also controls the Paracel (Xisha) Islands, which are also claimed by Vietnam, and asserts a claim to the Japanese-administered Senkaku (Diaoyu) Islands in the East China Sea.

South China Sea: On 16 June 2011, the Chinese government sent out one of its largest patrol ships known as the Haixun-31 which the Chinese government describe as routine. The ship will pass the Paracel and Spratly Islands and make its way up from the Malaysian to Filipino coast. Vietnam, China, the Philippines, Taiwan, Brunei and Malaysia all have competing claims to the Spratlys Islands while Beijing and Hanoi are in dispute over the Paracel islands. Hanoi has proposed a multilateral solution between the Asian countries but China says that it prefers to negotiate with individual states separately.

Border security 
The security and strength of the Chinese borders vary depending on the location of the section of the border in question. This is due to the nature of the borders as well as the physical geography of the country. China has a large territory, about the same size as the United States, but the actual distribution of population is highly disproportionate. Sixty percent of the population live on the east coast of China which is only 22 percent of its territory while the other 78 percent lying inland is sparsely populated with ethnic minorities such as Tibetans, Kazakhs, Uighurs, and other Chinese Muslim groups. Many of these groups have little to no loyalty to the central government of China further adding to the strained security of China's borders. The regions of Xinjiang and Tibet in particular harbor strong separatist movements

Tibet: Many Tibetans protest and actively support the Dalai Lama who lives in exile in what he calls "autonomous Tibet". The Chinese authorities charge him of promoting Tibetan independence and will not allow him to come back into the country or he will face arrest. In May 2018, a Tibetan activist known as Tashi Wangchuk was sentenced to prison for 5 years as he voiced his concerns over that Tibetan culture was being destroyed by the Chinese government. Amnesty International denounced this sentencing to be "beyond absurd" but his release is still dated to be in 2021.

Xinjiang: In the region of Xinjiang, Uighur separatists have engaged in acts of violence to promote independence. These Chinese Muslims have garnered support from neighboring areas in central Asia and Turkey both politically and economically. However, many of these efforts have been shut down by Chinese officials. The Xinjiang region is facing large scale immigration of Han Chinese people but the Uighurs still make up 8 out of the 19 million inhabitants. In August 2018, a UN human rights panel cited "creditable reports" that more than one million people in the region were being held in counter extremism centers in Xinjiang but Chinese officials claimed that only "religious extremist" Uighurs were undergoing re-education and resettlement.

China-Russia Relations: China and the Soviet Union signed an alliance in 1950 building on their communist relations that dated back to the 1920s. In the wake of the 1960s Sino-Soviet split, and for 25 years after the split, the border between China and Russia was one of the most unfriendly borders in the world. At one point over "one and a half million troops armed with nuclear weapons" were installed along the two sides of the border. Relations improved in the mid 1980s but this is due to Russia's decrease in power and threat to the Chinese government.

Due to China's ancient history and central location in the geography of Asia, it is surrounded by potential enemies and many complicated rivalries. The government plays the fine line between domination and cooperation in order to preserve their national identity and borders. However, due to the nature of their political geography, the borders are very much volatile and disputes continue to exist in different areas of the border.

Tajikistan: On 13 January 2011, the country of Tajikistan agrees to cede land to the Chinese government. The Tajik parliament voted to ratify a 1999 deal to cede 1000 square kilometers of land in the remote Pamir Mountain range which the Chinese claim thoroughly resolved the century long border dispute. China is the largest investor in the Tajik economy especially in the energy and infrastructure sectors.

Government 

The structure of government in China is in the framework of a socialist republic which is run by a single party: the Chinese Communist Party (CCP). The party wishes to control and manage the ideology of their subjects to maintain their political dominance in China. For example, Document Number Nine, or the Communiqué on the Current State of the Ideological Sphere, was a document circulated in China in 2013 to warn the citizens of China against some western values such as media freedom. Currently, Xi Jinping is the CCP general secretary, making him the paramount leader of China. The National People's Congress is the national legislature and the highest organ of state power.

The government is divided into three primary groups of state power: the National People's Congress (NPC), the President, and the State Council. Members of the State Council include the Premier, four vice premiers, five state councilors and 29 heads of State Council commissions. Under the Chinese constitution, the National Peoples congress holds the most power and meets annually for 2 weeks to discuss and review legislative policies.

As China has only one dominant party, the spatial patterns of voting and election results are favoring the dominant communist party. However, the country still has some other variables and variations in the divisions of administration. Local government is divided into four levels of hierarchy. Local government includes township, county, prefecture or municipality, and the province as the scope of government increases. China also has a system of autonomous regions intended to give more control to ethnic minorities who preside in those regions. In practice however, the power still remains with the party secretary while the local chairman is the nominal head.

Imperialism

Japan 
Historically there have been instances of imperialism in China. Japan had invaded and conquered much of Manchuria and Coastal cities in China in the Sino-Japanese war. Cities such as Nanjing and Hong Kong were devastated by Japanese forces with actions such as massacre and rape of civilians was rampant. This imperialism and invasion of Japanese forces still leads to tensions in modern day. For example in April 2005, a Japanese junior high textbook minimized the atrocities of Nanjing stating that the massacre was an "incident". The textbooks transgression sent thousands of Chinese citizens out to protest and three weeks of state sanctioned protest led to rising tensions between Japan and China.

Hong Kong and Britain 
Due to the opium wars between the British from 1839 to 1842, the British were able to make demands to the Chinese government before removing blockades and stopping bombardment on key ports. The Chinese agreed to cede the island of Hong Kong which in the control of the British, witnessed phenomenal growth. The population grew from 1,500 to 19,000 by 1844. In 1860 in the wake of the Second Opium war, the Peking convention was signed which ceded to Britain the Kowloon peninsula (up to Boundary Street) and Ngon Sun Chau, which was a part of mainland China. With the end of World War 2 however, the British lost control of the colonies and in 1997, the colony of Hong Kong was returned to the control of communist mainland China.

Trade Agreements 
China has bilateral investment agreements with 100+ countries and economies. China's bilateral investment agreements cover expropriation, arbitration, and other investment related issues. These bilateral agreements are generally much weaker than investment treaties that the United States would want to negotiate. China also maintains 14 free trade agreements(FTA's) and is currently implementing an additional 8 FTA's. China's FTA partners are ASEAN, Singapore, Pakistan, New Zealand, Chile, Peru, Costa Rica, Iceland, Switzerland, Hong Kong, Macao, Taiwan, Australia, and Korea. These trade agreements exist to maintain and organize business and trade with various countries in order to improve and expand the economy of China.

Population 
China in 2017, was reported to have a population of 1,379,302,711. In October 2015, China changed the long standing 1979 law that allowed each couple to have "one child". So that there would be enough youth to support the old, the government began to allow couples to have 2 children. With this rule, the birth rate increased to 12.3 births/1,000 population, and the death rate is reported to be 7.8 deaths/ 1,000 population. Established in 2017, the current population growth is at a .41%.

The current infant mortality total rate is 11.8 deaths/1,000 live births. For females the rate is 11.4 deaths/1,000 live births, and the males stand at 12.2 deaths/ 1,000 live births. In 2015 it was established that the maternal mortality rate is 27 deaths/ 100,000 live births. For both infant and maternal mortality rates, China stands at 118 in comparison to the world.

The people of China are beginning to move from the rural farming areas to the business centered cities. The rate of urbanization from 2015 to 2018 is at a 2.42% annual rate of change. China currently has an urban population of 59.3%. The most populated urban areas are: Shanghai 25.582 million, Tianjin 13.215 million, Guangdong 12.683 million, 19.618 million Beijing (capital), 11.908 million Shenzhen, 14.838 million Chongqing.

The life expectancy at birth for the total population stands at 75.7 years. While men are averaged out at 73.6 years, the woman of China are reported to have the life expectancy of 78 years.

Age Structure 

Below a 2016 population pyramid illustrates the population age structure throughout China. It can be observed that the youth of China is significantly lower than the working class. However, there is enough people in the working class to support the elders at the time. This can help prove physically the reasoning and push to change the "one child" 1979 law, to two.

Atmosphere and pollution

Climate 

Owing to tremendous differences in latitude, longitude, and altitude, the climate of China is extremely diverse, ranging from tropical in the far south to subarctic in the far north and alpine in the higher elevations of the Tibetan Plateau. Monsoon winds, caused by differences in the heat-absorbing capacity of the continent and the ocean, dominate the climate. During the summer, the East Asian Monsoon carries warm and moist air from the south and delivers the vast majority of the annual precipitation in much of the country. Conversely, the Siberian anticyclone dominates during winter, bringing cold and comparatively dry conditions. The advance and retreat of the monsoons account in large degree for the timing of the rainy season throughout the country. Although most of the country lies in the temperate belt, its climatic patterns are complex.

The northern extremities of both Heilongjiang and Inner Mongolia have a subarctic climate; in contrast, most of Hainan Island and parts of the extreme southern fringes of Yunnan have a tropical climate. Temperature differences in winter are considerable, but in summer the variance is considerably less. For example, Mohe County, Heilongjiang has a 24-hour average temperature in January approaching , while the corresponding figure in July exceeds .

Only in some pockets of the Dzungaria region of Xinjiang is the conspicuous seasonal variation in precipitation that defines Chinese (and, to a large extent, East Asian) climate absent.

Annual sunshine duration ranges from less than 1,100 hours in parts of Sichuan and Chongqing to over 3,400 hours in northwestern Qinghai. Seasonal patterns in sunshine vary considerably by region, but overall, the north and the Tibetan Plateau are sunnier than the south of the country.

Environment 

Air pollution (sulfur dioxide particulates) from reliance on coal is a major issue, along with water pollution from untreated wastes and use of debated standards of pollutant concentration rather than Total Maximum Daily Load. There are water shortages, particularly in the north. The eastern part of China often experiences smoke and dense fog in the atmosphere as a result of industrial pollution. Heavy deforestation with an estimated loss of one-fifth of agricultural land since 1949 to soil erosion and economic development is occurring with resulting desertification. 
China is a party to the Antarctic-Environmental Protocol, the Antarctic Treaty, the Convention on Biological Diversity, the Climate Change treaty, the United Nations Convention to Combat Desertification, the Endangered Species treaty, the Hazardous Wastes treaty, the Law of the Sea, the International Tropical Timber Agreements of 1983 and 1994, the International Convention for the Regulation of Whaling, and agreements on Marine Dumping, Ozone Layer Protection, Ship Pollution, and Wetlands protection. China has signed, but not ratified, the Kyoto Protocol (but is not yet required to reduce its carbon emission under the agreement, as is India) and the Nuclear Test Ban treaty.

See also

 Chinese geography
 History of human geography in China
 Environment of China
 List of islands of China
 List of rivers in China
 List of mountains in China
 Lakes in China
 North China Plain
 Geography of Hong Kong
 Geography of Macau
 Geographic information systems in China
 Zomia (geography)

Notes and references 

 Fitzpatrick, John. 1992. "The Middle Kingdom, the Middle Sea, and the Geographical Pivot of History". Review (fernand Braudel Center) 15 (3). Research Foundation of SUNY: 477–521. https://www.jstor.org/stable/40241233.

External links

 Chinese Academy of Sciences Institute of Geographical Sciences and Natural Resources
 Chinese Ecosystem Research Network (CERN)
  Illustrations of Famous Mountains from 1368–1644